Strange Magic may refer to:

 Strange Magic (film), a 2015 animated fantasy film
 Strange Magic (song), a 1975 Electric Light Orchestra song, whose name the film was based on
 Strange Magic: The Best of Electric Light Orchestra, a 1995 greatest hits album